Justicia irwinii is a plant native to the Cerrado vegetation of Brazil.

See also
 List of plants of Cerrado vegetation of Brazil

irwinii
Flora of Brazil
Plants described in 1989